Now That's What I Call Music! 61 or Now 61 refers to at least two Now That's What I Call Music! series albums, including

Now That's What I Call Music! 61 (UK series)
Now That's What I Call Music! 61 (U.S. series)